The Ultra Selection is a compact disc compilation album by old school hip hop/electo funk group Mantronix. The album was released on the Disky Communications label on March 14, 2005.

The album features selections chosen exclusively from Mantronix's 1990 album, This Should Move Ya.

Track listing
 "Got To Have Your Love" (Mantronik, Bryce Luvah) - 6:16
 "This Should Move Ya" (Luvah) - 2:55
 "Sex-N-Drugs And Rock-N-Roll" (Dury, Jankel, Mantronik, Luvah) - 3:34
 "Tonight Is Right" (Luvah) - 4:07
 "(I'm) Just Adjustin' My Mic ('91 Version)" (Luvah) - 3:25
 "Stone Cold Roach" (Luvah) - 3:16
 "I Get Lifted" (Luvah) - 3:32
 "Don't You Want More" (Luvah) - 3:48
 "I Like The Way (You Do It!)" (Luvah) - 4:00
 "Get Stupid Part IV (Get On Up '90)" (Luvah) - 3:08
 "King Of The Beats Lesson #1" (Luvah) - 1:43

External links
 [ The Ultra Selection] at Allmusic

2005 greatest hits albums
Mantronix albums